
Sura Quta (Aymara sura dry jiquima, a species of Pachyrhizus, quta lake, "sura lake", hispanicized spellings Sora Kkota, Sora Kota) is a small lake west of the Cordillera Real of Bolivia located in the La Paz Department, Los Andes Province, Pukarani Municipality, Patamanta Canton, south east of the Kunturiri massif and Tuni Lake. It is situated at a height of about 4,532 metres (14,869 ft), about 0.4 km long and 0.36 km at its widest point.

See also 
 Alka Quta
 Ch'iyar Quta
 Jach'a Jawira
 Juri Quta
 Lawrawani Lake
 Surikiña River

References

External links 
 Pukarani Municipality population data and map showing Taypi Chaka Quta situated south west of Sura Quta ("Sora Kota")

Lakes of La Paz Department (Bolivia)